FK Mutěnice is a football club located in Mutěnice (Hodonín District), Czech Republic. It currently plays in the fifth tier of Czech football.

The team played in the Moravian–Silesian Football League for four seasons before being forcibly relegated three levels lower due to financial problems in June 2010.

Previous seasons

 1999/2000: 1.A třída 1st, promoted
 2000/01: Regional Championship 1st, promoted
 2001/02: Czech Fourth Division 3rd
 2002/03: Czech Fourth Division 4th
 2003/04: Czech Fourth Division 2nd
 2004/05: Czech Fourth Division 3rd
 2005/06: Czech Fourth Division 1st, promoted
 2006/07: MSFL 2nd
 2007/08: MSFL  3rd
 2008/09: MSFL  11th
 2009/10: MSFL  13th, forcibly relegated
 2010/11: 1.A třída skupina B 1st
 2011/12: 1.A třída skupina B 1st
 2012/13: Regional Championship 3rd
 2013/14: Regional Championship 1st
 2014/15: Czech Fourth Division 16th

References

External links
 Official website 

Football clubs in the Czech Republic
Association football clubs established in 1926
Hodonín District